Lawn Bowls at the 2007 South Pacific Games was held 25 August to 8 September 2007 in Apia, Samoa.

Men's results

Women's results

See also
 Lawn bowls at the Pacific Games

References

2007 South Pacific Games
Lawn bowls at the Pacific Games
South Pacific Games